Mariana Francisca de Jesús Torres y Berriochoa OIC, (1563, Biscay – 16 January 1635, Quito), was an abbess of Conceptionist Monastery of Quito from 1593 to 1635.

Life 
Mariana was born in 1563 in Biscaya, Spain. Her father was Diego Torres Cádiz and her mother was María Berriochoa Álvaro. In 1577 a new Conceptionists monastery was established in Quito, and Maria de Jesus y Taboada (Mariana's aunt) was appointed as the first abbess. 21 September 1579 she took perpetual vows. Her aunt died on 4 October 1594. Between 1582 and 1634 she had Marian apparitions of Our Lady of Good Success. Mariana on 16 January 1635.

Veneration 
Her incorrupted relics were uncovered on 8 February 1906. On 8 August 1986 Archbishop of Quito Antonio José González Zumárraga. Luis E. Cadena y Almeida was appointed her canonisation process postulator.

References

Further reading 
The most detailed English-language biography currently available is The Admirable Life of Mother Mariana by Fr. Manuel Sousa Pereira, translated by Marian T. Horvat, Tradition in Action, 2005, 2 vols.

16th-century births
1563 births
1635 deaths
17th-century deaths
Marian visionaries
Ecuadorian Christians
Conceptionist nuns
Abbesses
Servants of God
Ecuadorian Servants of God
Spanish Servants of God
Spanish nobility